Huntington Municipal Airport  is a city-owned, public-use airport located three nautical miles (6 km) southeast of the central business district of Huntington, a city in Huntington County, Indiana, United States. According to the FAA's National Plan of Integrated Airport Systems for 2009–2013, it was classified as a general aviation airport.

Although most U.S. airports use the same three-letter location identifier for the FAA and IATA, this airport is assigned HHG by the FAA but has no designation from the IATA.

Facilities and aircraft 
It has one runway designated 9/27 with an asphalt surface measuring 5,001 by 75 feet (1,524 x 23 m).

For the 12-month period ending December 31, 2004, the airport had 17,139 aircraft operations, an average of 46 per day: 99% general aviation and 1% air taxi. At that time there were 67 aircraft based at this airport: 88% single-engine and 12% multi-engine.

References

External links 
 Aerial photo as of 20 April 1998 from USGS The National Map
 
 

Airports in Indiana
Transportation buildings and structures in Huntington County, Indiana